Propilidium is a genus of sea snails, the true limpets, marine gastropod mollusks in the family Lepetidae.

Species
Species within the genus Propilidium include:

 Propilidium curumim Leal & Simone, 1998
 Propilidium elegans A. E. Verrill, 1884
 Propilidium exiguum (Thompson W., 1844)
 Propilidium lissocona (Dall, 1927)
 Propilidium pelseneeri Thiele, 1912
 Propilidium pertenue Jeffreys, J.G., 1882
 Propilidium reticulatum (A. E. Verrill, 1885)
 Propilidium tasmanicum (Pilsbry, 1895)

References

External links

Lepetidae